Wheeleria is a genus of moths in the family Pterophoridae.

Species

Wheeleria elbursi Arenberger, 1981
Wheeleria ivae (Kasy, 1960)
Wheeleria kabuli (Arenberger, 1981)
Wheeleria kasachstanica Arenberger, 1995
Wheeleria leptopsamma (Meyrick, 1925)
Wheeleria lyrae (Arenberger, 1983)
Wheeleria obsoletus (Zeller, 1841)
Wheeleria parviflorellus (Arenberger, 1981)
Wheeleria phlomidis (Staudinger, 1870)
Wheeleria raphiodactyla (Rebel, 1900)
Wheeleria sobeidae (Arenberger, 1981)
Wheeleria spilodactylus (Curtis, 1827)

External links

Pterophorini
Moth genera
Taxa named by J. W. Tutt